The 2016–17 Premier League of Belize was the sixth season of the highest competitive football league in Belize, after it was founded in 2011. There were two seasons which were spread over two years. The opening was played towards the end of 2016 and the closing was played at the beginning of 2017.

Team information

Opening season

From the 2015–16 Premier League of Belize season, all 6 teams continued to play in the opening season of 2016–17. FC Belize and Freedom Fighters returned to the league, as well as a newly formed team, Orange Walk, making 9 teams in total.

There would be one league consisting of the 9 teams, who will play each other twice, with the top 4 teams advancing to the end of season playoffs. The opening season commenced on 20 August 2016.

League table

Results

Playoffs

Semi-finals 

Game One

Game Two

Finals 

Game One

Game Two

Season statistics

Top scorers

 Includes playoff goals.

Hat-tricks

4 Player scored 4 goals

Awards

In the post-game ceremonies of the final game of the season, the individual awards were announced.

Closing season

8 of the 9 teams that participated in the opening season will participate in the closing season, with Orange Walk not competing.

The format will be the same as the opening season with one league consisting of the 8 teams, who will play each other twice, with the top 4 teams advancing to the end of season playoffs. The closing season commenced on 28 January 2017.

League table

Results

Playoffs

Semi-finals 
Game One

Game Two

Finals 

Game One

Game Two

Season statistics

Top scorers

 Includes playoff goals.

Hat-tricks

4 Player scored 4 goals

Awards

In the post-game ceremonies of the final game of the season, the individual awards were announced.

References

Top level Belizean football league seasons
1
Bel